Dimitar Bosnov (Bulgarian: Димитър Боснов; 12 February 1933 - 17 March 2012) was a defender for Cherno More Varna from 1955 to 1970. He played 343 matches in the top Bulgarian division.

Bosnov died in Varna on 17 March 2012 aged 79.

References

External links
Player Profile at chernomorefc.com

1933 births
2012 deaths
Bulgarian footballers
OFC Sliven 2000 players
PFC Cherno More Varna players
First Professional Football League (Bulgaria) players
Association football defenders
Sportspeople from Sliven